

Xidayang Reservoir, also known as Xidayang Shuiku or West Dayang Reservoir, is a large-scale reservoir located in Baoshui Township, Tang County, Baoding City, Hebei Province, China.

History
West Dayang Reservoir was designed by the Design Institute of Hebei Provincial Water Resources Department (河北省水利厅设计院),  its construction began in 1958 and was completed in 1960.  In August 1970, the continued construction of the reservoir was completed.

In 2005, Xidayang Reservoir's consolidating and de-danger engineering (除险加固工程) started, with a total investment of 198 million yuan and a construction period of 36 months. 

In 2008, the connection project between Xidayang Reservoir and Wangkuai Reservoir was started, and in 2012, the connection project was completed.

References 

Reservoirs in China
1960 establishments in China
Buildings and structures in Hebei